Hoover is an unincorporated community in Adams Township, Cass County, Indiana. As of June 2022 Hoover has an approximate population of 35 residents.

History
Hoover had its start in the early 1870s by the building of the Eel River Railroad through that territory. It was named for its founder, Riley Hoover.

A post office was established at Hoover in 1873, and remained in operation until it was discontinued in 1928.

Geography

References

Unincorporated communities in Cass County, Indiana
Unincorporated communities in Indiana